Bourg-Saint-Bernard (Languedocien: Le Borg de Sant Bernat) is a commune of the Haute-Garonne department in southwestern France.

Population

The inhabitants of the commune are known as Bourguignons.

Monument

See also
Communes of the Haute-Garonne department

References

Communes of Haute-Garonne